Rosignano Monferrato is a comune (municipality) in the Province of Alessandria in the Italian region Piedmont, located about  east of Turin and about  northwest of Alessandria.

Rosignano Monferrato borders the following municipalities: Camagna Monferrato, Casale Monferrato, Cella Monte, Frassinello Monferrato, Ozzano Monferrato, San Giorgio Monferrato, and Terruggia.

People
Captain Michele Amatore died here in 1883.

Demographic evolution

References

Cities and towns in Piedmont